Strange Crime (also known as Under a False Name) is a 2004 French-Italian-Swiss mystery-drama film directed by Roberto Andò.

Cast 

Daniel Auteuil: Daniel
Anna Mouglalis: Mila / Ewa
Greta Scacchi: Nicoletta
Magdalena Mielcarz: Ewa / Mila
Giorgio Lupano: Fabrizio
Michael Lonsdale: David
Serge Merlin: Daniel's father

References

External links

2004 films
Italian crime drama films
Italian crime thriller films
Italian thriller drama films
2004 crime thriller films
2000s thriller drama films
2004 crime drama films
Adultery in films
Films about writers
Italian neo-noir films
Films scored by Ludovico Einaudi
Films directed by Roberto Andò
2000s Italian films